Christine Boyle is a Canadian politician in Vancouver, British Columbia, who was elected to Vancouver City Council in the 2018 municipal election. She is a member of OneCity Vancouver. She is a climate justice activist, United Church minister, and community organizer.

Personal life 
Boyle lives with her partner and children in Grandview–Woodlands.

Activism 
Boyle is a founder and director of the Self Care Project, focusing on fostering resilience for activists, and Spirited Social Change. She has been involved in Fossil Free Faith, an organization that encourages faith institutions to divest from fossil fuels. Due to their work, the United Church of Canada divested from fossil fuels in 2015.

In 2015, Boyle traveled to the Vatican to participate in events surrounding Laudato Si. She was also a delegate to the COP21 climate talks on behalf of the United Church of Canada. In 2018, Boyle participated in a day of faith-based protests against the Kinder Morgan Trans Mountain pipeline in Burnaby, BC.

Election campaign 
Boyle was motivated to run for office because of her commitment to "tackling the deepening wealth gap [in Vancouver], about ensuring that homes are for housing people rather than profits, and about deepening community engagement to build a better city together". She ran alongside Brandon Yan after winning the OneCity Vancouver candidate nomination in June 2018. Boyle won a seat on Vancouver City Council in October 2018 with 45,529 votes, making her the first elected city councillor from OneCity Vancouver and one of eight women on the ten-member council. She was re-elected to a second term on Vancouver City Council on October 15, 2022.

Electoral record

References 

Women in British Columbia politics
Women municipal councillors in Canada
21st-century Canadian women politicians
Vancouver city councillors
Living people
Canadian environmentalists
Canadian women environmentalists
Ministers of the United Church of Canada
Women Protestant religious leaders
Year of birth missing (living people)
21st-century Canadian politicians